Mallori Gibson (born February 23, 1987) is an American retired volleyball player who is now a volleyball coach, currently in charge of Stanislaus State Warriors women's volleyball team. In 2011 she played for Greek powerhouse Olympiacos in the Greek Women's Volleyball League and the Greek Cup. Gibson went on to win the 2011 Greek Cup with Olympiacos after a 3–2 win against AEK Athens in the final in Samos.

Sporting achievements

Clubs
 2010/2011  Greek Cup, with Olympiacos Piraeus

Individual
 2x All-Big West Conference First Team outside hitter, with Pacific Tigers

References

External links
 profile at greekvolley.gr 
 profile at cubuffs.com
 profile at pacifictigers.com

1987 births
Living people
American women's volleyball players
Olympiacos Women's Volleyball players
Pacific Tigers women's volleyball players
Sportspeople from Bakersfield, California
Outside hitters
American volleyball coaches
Expatriate volleyball players in Greece
American expatriate sportspeople in Greece
Volleyball players from California
Colorado Buffaloes women's volleyball players